Olteni is a commune in Teleorman County, Romania.

Olteni may also refer to:

Olteni, a village in Râmeț Commune, Alba County, Romania
Drăganu-Olteni, a village in Drăganu Commune, Argeș County, Romania
Olteni, a village in Bodoc Commune, Covasna County, Romania
Olteni, a village in Lucieni Commune, Dâmboviţa County, Romania
Olteni, a village in Uliești Commune, Dâmboviţa County, Romania
Olteni, a village in Clinceni Commune, Ilfov County, Romania
Olteni, a village in Independenţa Commune, Constanţa County, Romania
Olteni, a village in Teișani Commune, Prahova County, Romania
Olteni, a village in Vârteșcoiu Commune, Vrancea County, Romania
Olteni, a village in Bujoreni Commune, Vâlcea County, Romania

See also
Oltenia